The Bandhavgarh Fort is situated in Bandhavgarh in Umaria district of Madhya Pradesh, India. It is located on the Bandhavgarh hill, rising 811 meters above sea level at the centre of the Bandhavgarh National Park. It  is surrounded by many smaller hills separated by gently sloping valleys. These valleys end in small, swampy meadows, locally known as 'bohera'.

References

L.K.Chaudhari & Safi Akhtar Khan: Bandhavgarh-Fort of the Tiger, Wild Atlas Books, Bhopal, 2003
Shahbaz Ahmad: Charger the long living Tiger, Print World, Allahabad, 2001
W.A.Rodgers, H.S.Panwar and V.B.Mathur: Wildlife Protected Area Network in India: A review, Wildlife Institute of India, Dehradun, 2000
gulzar singh markam: gondwana ke garh darshan, bhopal, 2005

Forts in Madhya Pradesh
Umaria district
Places in the Ramayana